Cohors [prima] Bracaraugustanorum [quingenaria] equitata civium Romanorum ("[1st] part-mounted [500 strong] cohort of Roman citizens Bracari") was a Roman auxiliary regiment containing cavalry contingents. The cohort stationed in Dacia at castra Angustia and castra of Boroșneu Mare.

See also 
 List of Roman auxiliary regiments

References
 Academia Română: Istoria Românilor, Vol. 2, Daco-romani, romanici, alogeni, 2nd. Ed., București, 2010, 
 C.C. Giurescu: Istoria Românilor - Vol. I - Din cele mai vechi timpuri până la moartea lui Alexandru cel Bun, Ed. ALL, București, 2010, 

Military of ancient Rome
Auxiliary equitata units of ancient Rome
Roman Dacia